A bell roof (bell-shaped roof, ogee roof, Philibert de l'Orme roof) is a roof form resembling the shape of a bell. Bell roofs may be round, multi-sided or square. A similar-sounding feature added to other roof forms at the eaves or walls is bell-cast,  sprocketed or flared eaves, the roof flairs upward resembling the common shape of the bottom of a bell.

Gallery

See also
 List of roof shapes
 Stupa

References

Roofs